Márcio Navarro  (pronounced  ; born September 17, 1978) is a retired Brazilian professional mixed martial artist and professional kickboxer. Navarro is the former International Sport Karate Association (ISKA) light middleweight oriental rules world champion. Navarro also is an instructor at Valor Martial Arts in Wichita, Kansas.

Kickboxing career
Navarro began training in kickboxing in 1992. He won the vacant ISKA light middleweight oriental rules world championship belt on September 21, 2012, defeating Thomas Longacre by split decision (49-48, 48-49 and 49–48). He was later stripped of the title because he was not defending it since he began to focus on his mixed martial arts career instead. He retired on July 21, 2018, after a winning a fight by knockout via a head kick.

MMA career
Navarro began his MMA career in 2008 with TKO victory over Sandro Vieira da Silva in his hometown of Indaiatuba, Brazil.  Shortly after the fight, he moved to the United States. Navarro fought his first fight in the United States on November 9, 2008, against Adam Sohayda in Orange County, California. He won the fight by TKO in the 2nd round. On October 29, 2011, fought Rudy Bears on Bellator LVI in the Local Feature Fights. Navarro defeated Bears by split decision. Navarro has fought 29 fights in his career winning 15. Navarro fought Donnie Bell at Bellator CIII and lost via submission by rear neck crank. Navarro fought in his third Bellator fight at Bellator CXIII against Bobby Cooper and lost the fight via unanimous decision, extending his losing streak to four fights. Navarro broke his losing streak with a 1st-round knockout of local fighter Demian Papagni. He fought his fourth Bellator fight at Bellator 130 against Cody Carrillo. Carillo gave a verbal submission from multiple punches.

MMA record

|-
|Loss
| align=center|15–14
| Henry Lindsay
| TKO (punches)
| Bellator 150
| February 26, 2016
| align=center|1
| align=center|2:30
| Mulvane, Kansas, United States
| 
|-
| Loss
| align=center|15–13
| Brian Foster
| KO
| XFI 14
| July 18, 2015
| align=center| 1
| align=center| 0:45
| Fort Smith, Arkansas, United States
|
|-
| Loss
| align=center| 15–12
| Codale Ford
| Decision (unanimous)
| Rage on the River 03/20/15
| March 20, 2015
| align=center| 3
| align=center| 5:00
| Tulsa, Oklahoma, United States
|
|-
| Win
| align=center| 15–11
| Kyle Sjafiroudden
| Submission (rear-naked choke)
| OFC 3
| November 22, 2014
| align=center| 2
| align=center| 2:29
| Concho, Oklahoma, United States
| Won OFC Lightweight championship
|-
| Win
| align=center| 14–11
| Cody Carrillo
| Submission (punches)
| Bellator 130
| 
| align=center| 3
| align=center| 2:09 
| Mulvane, Kansas, United States
| 
|-
| Win
| align=center| 13–11
| Demian Papagni
| KO (head kick)
| Friday Night Fights
| 
| align=center| 1
| align=center| 2:37
| Wichita, Kansas, United States
| Knockout of the night
|-
| Loss
| align=center| 12–11
| Bobby Cooper
| Decision (unanimous)
| Bellator CXIII
| 
| align=center| 3
| align=center| 5:00
| Mulvane, Kansas, United States
| 
|-
| Loss
| align=center| 12–10
| Donnie Bell
| Submission (rear neck crank)
| Bellator CIII
| 
| align=center| 1
| align=center| 2:06
| Mulvane, Kansas, United States
| 
|-
| Loss
| align=center| 11–9
| Jake Lindsey
| KO (punch)
| VFC Fight Night: Wichita 1
| 
| align=center| 1
| align=center| 2:12
| Wichita, Kansas, United States
| For VFC Lightweight Championship
|-
| Loss
| align=center| 11–8
| Jon Carson
| Decision (unanimous)
| Xtreme Fight Night
| 
| align=center| 5
| align=center| 5:00
| Tulsa, Oklahoma, United States
| For XFL Lightweight Championship
|-
| Win
| align=center| 11–7
| Mike Osborn
| Submission (rear-naked choke)
| Battle at Beech
| 
| align=center| 1
| align=center| 3:11
| Wichita, Kansas, United States
| 
|-
| Win
| align=center| 10–7
| Brian Grinnell
| TKO (punches)
| Seasons Beatings
| 
| align=center| 2
| align=center| 1:53
| Wichita, Kansas, United States
| Knockout of the night 
|-
| Win
| align=center| 9–7
| Rudy Bears
| Decision (split)
| Bellator LVI
| 
| align=center| 3
| align=center| 5:00
| Kansas City, Kansas, United States
| 
|-
| Loss
| align=center| 8–7
| Thomas Schulte
| TKO (punches)
| KOTC: Apocalypse
| 
| align=center| 1
| align=center| 1:30
| Thackerville, Oklahoma, United States
| 
|-
| Loss
| align=center| 8–6
| Nick Nolte
| Decision (unanimous)
| Titan Fighting Championship 19
| 
| align=center| 3
| align=center| 5:00
| Kansas City, Kansas, United States
| 
|-
| Win
| align=center| 8–5
| Salvador Woods
| Decision (split)
| Wright Fights 2
| 
| align=center| 3
| align=center| 5:00
| St. Charles, Missouri, United States
| 
|-
| Loss
| align=center| 7–5
| Dylan Smith
| Submission
| XFL – Rumble on the River 2
| 
| align=center| 1
| align=center| 1:01
| Tulsa, Oklahoma, United States
| 
|-
| Win
| align=center| 7–4
| Rico Cato
| Submission
| Rock It Hard
| 
| align=center| 2
| align=center| 0:55
| Oklahoma City, Oklahoma, United States
| 
|-
| Win
| align=center| 6–4
| Dylan Smith
| Decision (split)
| XFL – Rumble on the River 1
| 
| align=center| 3
| align=center| 5:00
| Tulsa, Oklahoma, United States
| 
|-
| Loss
| align=center| 5–4
| Charles Jones
| Decision (unanimous)
| Bricktown Brawl 4
| 
| align=center| 3
| align=center| 5:00
| Oklahoma City, Oklahoma, United States
| 
|-
| Win
| align=center| 5–3
| Aaron Hedrick
| Decision (split)
| Red Dragon Promotions – Enter the Septagon
| 
| align=center| 3
| align=center| 5:00
| Oklahoma City, Oklahoma, United States
| 
|-
| Loss
| align=center| 4–3
| Levi Avera
| Submission (armbar)
| XFL – Final Fury
| 
| align=center| 1
| align=center| 1:13
| Bixby, Oklahoma, United States
| 
|-
| Win
| align=center| 4–2
| Jake Fox
| Submission (rear-naked choke)
| NLCF – Midwest Maddness
| 
| align=center| 2
| align=center| 1:08
| Wichita, Kansas, United States
| 
|-
| Loss
| align=center| 3–2
| Tim Means
| TKO (punches)
| KOTC: Gunslinger
| 
| align=center| 1
| align=center| 3:53
| Concho, Oklahoma, United States
| 
|-
| Loss
| align=center| 3–1
| Joe Heiland
| Decision (unanimous)
| Slammin Jammin Weekend 3
| 
| align=center| 3
| align=center| 3:00
| Newkirk, Oklahoma, United States
| 
|-
| Win
| align=center| 3–0
| Herman Terrado
| Decision (unanimous)
| Slammin Jammin Weekend 2
| 
| align=center| 3
| align=center| 5:00
| Newkirk, Oklahoma, United States
| 
|-
| Win
| align=center| 2–0
| Adam Sohayda
| TKO (punches)
| Fist Series: OctoberFist 2008
| 
| align=center| 2
| align=center| 1:08
| Orange County, California, United States
| 
|-
| Win
| align=center| 1–0
| Sandro Vieira da Silva
| TKO (punches)
| IFC – Vale Tudo
| 
| align=center| 1
| align=center| 3:30
| Indaiatuba, Brazil
|

Personal
Navarro is married with four children. Navarro teaches kickboxing, MMA, Capoeira, Brazilian Jiu-Jitsu, and fitness classes at Valor Martial Arts in Wichita, Kansas. He joined the United States Air Force Reserves in 2017 shortly after becoming a United States citizen.

References

External links
Navarro on Facebook

Valor Martial Arts website

1978 births
Living people
Mixed martial artists from Kansas
Sportspeople from Wichita, Kansas
Lightweight mixed martial artists
Brazilian capoeira practitioners
Brazilian male mixed martial artists
Mixed martial artists utilizing Brazilian jiu-jitsu
Mixed martial artists utilizing capoeira
Mixed martial artists utilizing taekwondo
Brazilian practitioners of Brazilian jiu-jitsu
People awarded a black belt in Brazilian jiu-jitsu
Brazilian male taekwondo practitioners
Brazilian male kickboxers
American sportspeople of Brazilian descent
Sportspeople from São Paulo (state)
People from Indaiatuba